Nacidos para cantar is a  1965 Argentine film.

Plot
The famous artist discovers his identical twin while touring Argentina. There are many complications, but in the end, the twin love triumphs.

Cast
 Enrique Guzmán
 Violeta Rivas
 Juan Ramon
 Julissa
 Zulma Faiad
 Jorge Luz
 Los T.N.T
 Chucho Salinas
 Mario Fortuna
 Pablo De Madaleingoitia
 Vicente Rubino
 Música Lucio Milena
 Canciones Chico Novarro

References

External links 
 
 Nacidos para cantar at violetarivas.com.ar

1965 films
1960s Spanish-language films
Argentine black-and-white films
1960s Argentine films